Mandawali Fazalpur is a political constituency of East Delhi. It is the Brahman and Gurjar dominated village. The majority Brahman gotra is Jamdagni and Gurjar gotra is dedha & nagar. It is one of the biggest village in Delhi. It has one of the biggest market in east Delhi. The villagers of this village are very rich & fulfilled. By the time other castes are also live there. It is one of the oldest village of Delhi. Previously an unauthorized colony, Mandawali was regularized in 2012. It comes under Municipal Corporation of East Delhi. It comes under the jurisdiction on Municipal Corporation of Delhi or MCD.

Neighborhoods 
Ghazipur village
 A Block
 Hasanpur Village
 Sewa Sadan Block
 Ooncha 
 Fatakwali Sabzi Mandi 
 Oonchewali Sabzi Mandi 
 Railway Colony 
 Urja Vihar 
 Shiv Mandir Road 
B Block Mandawali 
Shanti Marg 
Vinod Nagar East 
Vinod Nagar west
Allah Colony

References 

East Delhi district